Passo Fundo is a municipality in the north of the southern Brazilian state of Rio Grande do Sul. It is named after its river. It's the twelfth largest city in the state with an estimated population of 204,722 inhabitants living in a total municipal area of 780 km2.

Passo Fundo is a city well known because of the singer, composer and filmmaker Vitor Mateus Teixeira, better known as Teixeirinha, he was born in the city of Rolante in Rio Grande do Sul, and adopted the city of Passo Fundo as his own, the singer liked a lot from the city, in 1960 he composed the song "Gaúcho de Passo Fundo", which was very successful and made Passo Fundo become a known city throughout Brazil. Teixeirinha composed two more songs in homage to the city of Passo Fundo, they are "Saudades de Passo Fundo" (1963) and "Passo Fundo do Coração" (1973), as well as producing and starring in a film set in the city, a film called "O Gaucho de Passo Fundo", released in 1978.

Geography

Accessibility
The following highways leave Passo Fundo:
BR 285: east to west
BR 153: north to south
RS 324: northwest to southeast
RS 135: northeast 

The town is served by Lauro Kurtz Airport located on BR-285, São José. Daily flights from Passo Fundo are headed to:
With Oceanair - Guarulhos, SP
With Azul - Campinas, SP
With NHT - Porto Alegre, Santo Ângelo, Pelotas, Rio Grande, Sant'Ana do Livramento/Riveira, Santa Maria, Florianópolis, Curitiba, Santa Rosa, Erechim, Caçador, and Joaçaba.

Distances to other major cities
Distances from Passo Fundo to:
Bagé, RS: .
Balneário Camboriú, SC: 
Buenos Aires, Argentina: .
Caxias do Sul, RS: .
Chapecó, SC: .
Curitiba, PR: .
Florianópolis, SC: .
Montevideo, Uruguay: .
Pelotas, RS: .
Porto Alegre, RS: .
Santana do Livramento, RS: .
Santa Maria, RS: .
São Paulo, SP : .
Uruguaiana, RS: .

Climate
Winters can be slightly cool with temperatures below , frequent frosts and occasional snowfalls. Humidity is around 70% every month.

Economy

The economy is predominantly based on services, with some light industry and agriculture in the surrounding area. Transformation industries employed 8,731 workers in 2006, with commerce employing 19,287, public administration employing 2,808, education employing 3,374, and health employing 4,624 workers.

In the agricultural sector there was limited cattle-raising activity due to the small area of the municipality. The poultry industry was of some significance. The main crops were corn, soybeans, and wheat. In 2006 there were 887 farms employing around 3,600 workers, most of whom were relatives of the farm owner.

Health and education
Passo Fundo is the third largest medical center in southern Brazil. The city has one of the largest and most modern radiology centers and radiation based at São Vicente de Paulo Hospital.

On the Human Development Index Passo Fundo was given .804 in 2000, ranking 149 out of 467 municipalities in the state and 478 out of 3,527 municipalities in the country. Life expectancy (male and female) was 68.5 and the literacy rate was 94%.

In 2005 there were 72 health establishments, of which 4 were hospitals providing 837 beds (69 public).
Hospital Beneficente Dr. César Santos,
Endereço: Alcides Moura, 82 - Vila Popular
Hospital da Cidade de Passo Fundo
Endereço: Tiradentes, 295 - Centro
Hospital Prontoclínica LTDA
Endereço: Doutor Arthur Leite, 37 - Centro
Hospital São Vicente de Paulo
Endereço: Teixeira Soares, 808 - Centro

In the educational sector there were 78 primary schools, 8 middle and secondary schools, and 53 pre-primary schools. In 2005 there were 5 institutes of higher education with around 12,000 students.

The schools of higher education are:
 Faculdade de tecnologia SENAC
Endereço: Sete de Setembro, 1045 - Centro
Site:www.senacrs.com.br
Faculdade Meridional
Endereço: Senador Pinheiro, 304 - Vila Cruzeiro
Site:www.imed.edu.br
Faplan
Endereço: Paissandu, 1200 - Centro
Site:www.faplan.edu.br
Portal Faculdades
Endereço: RS-153, 555 - Vila Nossa Senhora Aparecida
Site:www.facportal.com.br
UPF - Universidade de Passo Fundo
Endereço: BR-285, Km 171 - São José
Site:www.upf.tche.br

National Renown
Passo Fundo is nicknamed "A Terra de Gente Boa", Portuguese for "The Land of Good People or Folks."  The city is known as being one of the most gaúcho cities in all of Rio Grande do Sul. It is not uncommon to see gaúchos walking the streets of Passo Fundo dressed in their full pilcha or typical gaúcho costumes. It is also known by the country as the National Capital of Literature, according to the law nº 11.264, because of the many literary events and debates organized in the city, such as the National Journey of Literature and the highest readership in the country (6.5 books per year per inhabitant).

Notable people
Passo Fundo is the home town of football coach Luiz Felipe Scolari, and also of the philosopher, opera singer, poet and Germanic philologist Henrique García, and the adopted place of Teixeirinha, a Gaúcho folkloric performer, the modern gaúcho band Pala Velho, as well as it is known for being Pipe's birthplace. The city is the seat of the Roman Catholic Archdiocese of Passo Fundo, elevated from a Diocese in 2011. It is also home of supermodel Letícia Birkheuer and famous volleyball players and brothers Gustavo and Murilo Endres.

In popular culture
The city was mentioned in the 2002 M. Night Shyamalan science fiction-thriller Signs as the origin of a video from a child's birthday party, in which an image of an alien was captured.

References

External links

Passo Fundo City Hall
Hotel in Passo Fundo
Passo Fundo at Google Maps
Projeto Passo Fundo (Apoio à cultura)

Municipalities in Rio Grande do Sul
Populated places established in 1827